Kenari may refer to:
Canarium ovatum or canarium nut
Perodua Kenari, a car
Kenari, Senen, Indonesia
Kenari, Iran (disambiguation)